The following is a list of BYU Cougars football seasons for the football team that has represented Brigham Young University in NCAA competition.

Seasons

References 

 
Lists of college football seasons
BYU Cougars football seasons